Charles Summerville Roller Jr. (September 8, 1879 – March 16, 1963) was an American football player and coach.  He served as the head football coach at Furman University from 1901 to 1902 and at the Virginia Military Institute (VMI) from 1907 to 1908, compiling a career college football coaching record of 14–10–5.  Roller's 1902 Furman Purple Hurricane football team had wins over North Carolina A&M and South Carolina.  From 1903 until 1913 Furman did not field a football team.

Roller played at VMI, where he was an All-Southern quarterback.  He worked as an assistant football coach at Washington and Lee University in 1908. 

Roller attended the Augusta Military Academy in Fort Defiance, Virginia, where his father, Charles Summerville Roller, was a founder of the school and commandant.  The younger Roller served as commandant and principal of that school later in his life.  During World War I he served as a major with the Red Cross in Europe.  Roller died in Fort Defiance on March 16, 1963.

Head coaching record

References

External links
 

1879 births
1963 deaths
American football quarterbacks
Furman Paladins football coaches
VMI Keydets football coaches
VMI Keydets football players
Washington and Lee Generals football coaches
All-Southern college football players
American military personnel of World War I
People from Augusta County, Virginia
Players of American football from Virginia